Marie-Madeleine Lachenais, known as Joute (Arcahaie, Haiti 1778 – Kingston, Jamaica 22 July 1843), was a politically active and influential Haitian woman. She was the mistress and political advisor of  both president Alexandre Sabès Pétion and president Jean-Pierre Boyer, and exerted a significant influence over the affairs of state during their presidencies for a period of 36 years (1807–1843). She was called "The President of two Presidents," and regarded to have been the most politically powerful woman in the history of Haiti before the introduction of women’s suffrage in 1950.

Biography
Marie-Madeleine Lachenais was the daughter of Marie Thérèse Fabre and the French colonel de Lachenais. She had a relationship with Alexandre Petion, with whom she had two daughters, Cecile and Hersilie. In 1807, Alexandre Petion became president, and she acted as his adviser. Petion appointed Jean-Pierre Boyer as his successor with her support.

After the installment of Jean-Pierre Boyer in 1818, she functioned as mistress and political adviser to Boyer as well and had a daughter, Azema, with him. Her will affected the acts passed in parliament between 1818 and 1840. In 1838, she persuaded Boyer to remain as president when he contemplated to step down. She also revealed and prevented a planned coup, in which Faustin Soulouque was involved.

After the deposition of Boyer in 1843, Lachenais and her daughters, referred to as Boyers family, were escorted to a ship to follow Boyer in his exile to Jamaica. She and her daughters lived on a pension from Haiti, which were officially only granted to her daughter Cecile. Boyer is reported to have married her, or to have had plans to marry her, shortly before her death. She died shortly after her arrival in Jamaica.

See also
 Victoire Jean-Baptiste

References
 https://web.archive.org/web/20150924024729/http://www.haiticulture.ch/Madeleine_Lachenais.html
 Georges Corvington, Port-au-Prince au cours des ans, Tome III pp83 et 93
 Placide David, cité dans Femmes haïtiennes, op.cit. p67.

1778 births
1843 deaths
Haitian women in politics
19th-century Haitian people
Haitian people of French descent
19th-century Haitian women